The Bahamian raccoon (Procyon lotor maynardi), also called Bahama raccoon or Bahamas raccoon, is a subspecies of the common raccoon endemic on the New Providence Island in the Bahamas. The binomial name, maynardi, comes from Charles Johnson Maynard, an American naturalist.

Classification 

Thought to be a distinct species in the past, the Bahamian raccoon is now considered a subspecies of the common raccoon, as a result of a study of morphological and genetic analysis in 2003. The assumption that its occurrence on the Bahamas is the result of a human-sponsored introduction just a few centuries ago is supported by the fact that the Bahaman raccoon seems to be closely related to the Guadeloupe raccoon found on Guadeloupe, an archipelago nearly 2,000 km (1,243 mi) away, as well as records of raccoons being present on Cuba, Hispaniola, and Jamaica.

Description 

The Bahamian raccoon is small compared to the average size of the common raccoon, making it an example of insular dwarfism. Its delicate skull and dentition are similar to the ones of the Guadeloupe raccoon and the small subspecies of the Florida Keys. The coat is gray, with a slight ocher tint on the neck and shoulders, and the mask is interrupted by a distinct gap between the eyes. On the underparts, only few guard hairs cover the ground hairs.

Conservation

The authors of the study Taxonomic status and conservation relevance of the raccoons (Procyon spp.) of the West Indies (2003) say the Bahamian raccoon is an invasive species which poses a threat to the insular ecosystem. The Bahamian Ministry of Health and Environment lists it as up for eradication on the islands of New Providence and Grand Bahama.

See also
Island raccoon

References

Mammals of the Bahamas
Procyonidae
Endemic fauna of the Bahamas
Mammals of the Caribbean
Taxonomy articles created by Polbot